The Station Road Bridge, near Brecksville, Ohio, was built in 1882. It spans the Cuyahoga River between Cuyahoga County and Summit County, Ohio. It was listed on the National Register of Historic Places in 1979.

The bridge was documented in the Historic American Engineering Record in 1985.

It was built by the Massillon Bridge Company. It is a Pratt Whipple truss bridge, described as "a metal through truss of the double-intersection Pratt (Whipple) type. The essential features of the type are inclined end posts and diagonal (tension) members that extend across two panels. The bridge features an ornamental plate at the top chord at each approach which reads "Massillon Bridge Company / 82 / Builders, Massillon, Ohio".

See also
List of bridges documented by the Historic American Engineering Record in Ohio

References

External links

Bridges on the National Register of Historic Places in Ohio
Historic American Engineering Record in Ohio
National Register of Historic Places in Cuyahoga County, Ohio
National Register of Historic Places in Summit County, Ohio
Buildings and structures completed in 1882
National Register of Historic Places in Cuyahoga Valley National Park